Tiberius Julius Abdes Pantera (c. 22 BC – AD 40) was a Roman-Phoenician soldier born in Sidon, whose tombstone was found in Bingerbrück, Germany, in 1859. A historical connection from this soldier to Jesus has long been hypothesized by numerous scholars, based on the claim of the ancient Greek philosopher Celsus, who, according to Christian writer Origen in his "Against Celsus"  (Greek Κατὰ Κέλσου, Kata Kelsou; Latin Contra Celsum), was the author of a work entitled The True Word (Greek Λόγος Ἀληθής, Logos Alēthēs).

Celsus' work was lost but, in Origen's account of it, Jesus was depicted as the result of an affair between his mother Mary and a Roman soldier. He said she was "convicted of adultery and had a child by a certain soldier named Panthera". Biblical scholar James Tabor claimed that Tiberius Pantera could have been serving in the region at the time of Jesus's conception,  but more recent scholarship has shown this claim to be greatly doubtful. Christopher Zeichmann goes so far as to say, "Where precisely Pantera's unit was located during the years leading up to Jesus' conception is uncertain, but it is beyond doubt that it was not Judaea or Galilee."

Both the ancient Talmud and medieval Jewish writings and sayings reinforced this notion, referring to "Yeshu ben Pantera", which translates as "Jesus, son of Pantera". Tabor's hypothesis is considered highly unlikely by mainstream scholars given that there is little other evidence to support Pantera's paternity outside of the Greek and Jewish texts.

Historically, the name Pantera is not unusual and was in use among Roman soldiers.

Tombstone

Discovery

In October 1859, during the construction of a railroad in Bingerbrück in Germany, tombstones for nine Roman soldiers were accidentally discovered. One of the tombstones was that of Tiberius Julius Abdes Pantera and is presently kept in the Römerhalle museum in Bad Kreuznach, Germany.

The inscription (CIL XIII 7514) on the tombstone of Abdes Pantera reads:

Analysis
The name Pantera is Greek, although it appears in Latin in the inscription. It was perhaps his last name, and means panther. The names Tiberius Julius are acquired names and were probably given to him in recognition of serving in the Roman army as he obtained Roman citizenship on his honorable discharge from the Legion.

The meaning of the name Abdes is up for speculation. Abd in Phoenician means "servant of", and es is perhaps short for Eshmoun/Eshmun, a Phoenician god of healing and the tutelary god of Sidon. However, it is also possible that Pantera was ethnically (and/or religiously) Jewish, given his birthplace. Zeichmann points out that the name Abdes is "commonly attested among Jews and others in the Levant" and has direct adaptations in Greek, Hebrew, and several other languages, many of which are Semitic.

Pantera was from Sidonia, which is identified with Sidon in Phoenicia, and joined the Cohors I Sagittariorum (first cohort of archers).

Pantera is not an unusual name, and its use goes back at least to the 2nd century. Prior to the end of the 19th century, at various times in history scholars had hypothesized that the name Pantera was an uncommon or even a fabricated name, but in 1891 French archaeologist C. S. Clermont-Ganneau showed that it was a name that was in use in Iudaea by other people and Adolf Deissmann later showed with certainty that it was a common name at the time, and that it was especially common among Roman soldiers, which would also fit the name Pantera, because the standard bearer of a Roman unit wore an animal fur on official occasions. In this case this would have been the fur of a predatory cat.

At that time, Roman army enlistments were for 25 years and Pantera served 40 years in the army until his death at 62. Pantera was most likely the standard bearer (signifer) of his cohort.

Ethiopian ecclesiastical literature
A soldier by the name of Pantos/Pantera also appears twice in Ethiopian church documents. In the First Book of Ethiopian Maccabees he is listed as one of three brothers who resists the Seleucid invasion of Judea. Within the text itself he is cited as receiving his name from the act of strangling panthers with his bare hands. This name and personage also appears in the text of the Ethiopian Synaxarion (Tahisas 25), where he is remembered along with his brothers in the canon of Ethiopian saints.

Hypothesis concerning a connection to Jesus

2nd-century usage by Celsus

In the 2nd century, Celsus, a Greek philosopher, wrote that Jesus's father was a Roman soldier named Panthera. The views of Celsus drew responses from Origen, who considered it a fabricated story. Celsus' claim is only known from Origen's reply. Origen writes:

Celsus' wide-ranging criticism of Christianity included the assertions that Christians had forsaken the laws of their fathers, that their minds had been held captive by Jesus and that the teachings of Jesus included nothing new and were simply a repetition of the sayings of the Greek philosophers. Marcus J. Borg and John Dominic Crossan state that given the antagonism of Celsus towards Christianity, his suggestion of the Roman parentage of Jesus might derive from the memory of Roman military operations suppressing a revolt at Sepphoris near Nazareth around the time of Jesus' birth. The "common legionary name" Panthera could have arisen from a satirical connection between the Greek words panthēr meaning "panther, various spotted Felidae" and  parthenos meaning "virgin".

Jewish usage in the Middle Ages

The story that Jesus was the son of a man named Pantera is referred to in the Talmud, in which Jesus is widely understood to be the figure referred to as "Ben Stada":

Peter Schäfer explains this passage as a commentary designed to clarify the multiple names used to refer to Jesus, concluding with the explanation that he was the son of his mother's lover "Pantera", but was known as "son of Stada", because this name was given to his mother, being "an epithet which derives from the Hebrew/Aramaic root sat.ah/sete' ('to deviate from the right path, to go astray, to be unfaithful'). In other words, his mother Miriam was also called 'Stada' because she was a sotah, a woman suspected, or rather convicted, of adultery." A few of the references explicitly name Jesus ("Yeshu") as the "son of Pandera": these explicit connections are found in the Tosefta, the Qohelet Rabbah, and the Jerusalem Talmud, but not in the Babylonian Talmud.

The Toledot Yeshu dates to the Middle Ages and appeared in Aramaic as well as Hebrew as an anti-Christian satirical chronicle of Jesus, also refers to the name Pantera, or Pandera. The book accuses Jesus of illegitimate birth as the son of Pandera, and of heretical and at times violent activities along with his followers during his ministry.

Scholarly assessment
Raymond E. Brown states that the story of Panthera is a fanciful explanation of the birth of Jesus which includes very little historical evidence. James Tabor suggests that Celsus' information about Jesus' paternity is correct, and argues that Tiberius Julius Abdes Pantera's career places him in Judea as a young man around the time of Jesus' conception, so he may have been Jesus' father. Such has not gained a wide consensus. Biblical scholar Maurice Casey rejected Tabor's hypothesis and states that Tabor has presented no evidence for Pantera's presence in the region, a conclusion affirmed by Christopher Zeichmann.

Bruce Chilton and Craig A. Evans state that the Toledot Yeshu consists primarily of fictitious anti-Christian stories based on the ongoing attempt of the Jews to discredit Jesus as their long-awaited Messiah, and that it offers no value to historical research on Jesus. The Blackwell Companion to Jesus states that the Toledot Yeshu has no historical facts and was perhaps created as a tool for warding off conversions to Christianity.

Throughout the centuries, both Christian and Jewish scholars have generally only paid minor attention to the Toledot Yeshu. Robert E. Van Voorst states that the literary origins of Toledot Yeshu cannot be traced with any certainty, and given that it is unlikely to have been written before the 4th century, it is far too late to include authentic remembrances of Jesus. The nature of the Toledot Yeshu as a parody of the Christian gospels is manifested by the claim that the Apostle Peter pretended to be Christian so he could separate them from the Jews and its portrayal of Judas Iscariot as a hero who posed as a disciple of Jesus in order to stop the Christians.

See also
Historical Jesus
Historicity of Jesus
Julia gens
The True Word
Toledot Yeshu
Yeshu

References

External links
The tombstone and inscription
Thierry Murcia, "Yeshua Ben Panthera: l'origine du nom. Status quaestionis et nouvelles investigations", in Judaïsme ancien / Ancient Judaism 2, 2014, p. 157-207.

1st-century BC Phoenician people
1st-century Phoenician people
1st-century Romans
20s BC births
40 deaths
Ancient Roman soldiers
Early Christianity-related inscriptions
Historical perspectives on Jesus
Abdes Pantera, Tiberius
Latin inscriptions
People from Sidon
Virgin birth of Jesus